The College of the University of Chicago is the university's sole undergraduate institution and one of its oldest components, emerging contemporaneously with the university's Hyde Park campus in 1892. Instruction is provided by faculty from across all graduate divisions and schools for its 6,801 students, but the College retains a select group of young, proprietary scholars who teach its core curriculum offerings. Unlike many major American research universities, the College is small in comparison to the University's graduate divisions, with graduate students outnumbering undergraduates at a 2:1 ratio. The College is most notable for its core curriculum pioneered by Robert Maynard Hutchins, which remains among the most expansive of highly ranked American colleges, as well as its emphasis on preparing students for continued graduate study since 85% of graduates go onto graduate study within 5 years of graduation, which is higher than any other school, and around 15-20% of graduates go on to receive PhDs.

Reputation and admissions
For 2016, 2017, and 2018, U.S. News & World Report ranked the University of Chicago third in the nation for undergraduate education, behind Princeton and Harvard, and tied with Yale.

In 2012, Forbes magazine ranked the University of Chicago's undergraduate program 4th in the country, ahead of every Ivy League institution except Princeton; it was also ranked 1st in the Midwest, 3rd among research universities, and 4th among private colleges. In 2010, Forbes also named the University of Chicago a "billionaire university," ranking the university as the 6th most successful in the country for producing billionaire alumni.

In 2007 Princeton Review named the College as having the "Best Undergraduate Academic Experience" in the United States.  In the 2012 edition of The Best 376 Colleges, the Princeton Review ranked UChicago 7th for politically active students, 9th for students who study the most, 13th for the best college library, and named it a "best-value college"; the Princeton Review moreover finds that in general applicants to UChicago also simultaneously apply to Ivy League institutions and their associates.

In 2012, Newsweek ranked UChicago 5th for having happy students, 9th for academic rigor, and 12th for being stressful.

In 2012, the QS World University Rankings ranked the University of Chicago as the 4th best institution of higher learning in the United States, after MIT, Harvard, and Yale, as well as 8th in the entire world.

In addition, College Crunch, an online college admissions resource, ranked the University of Chicago as 1st in the country among colleges and universities for its undergraduate college.

The University also has the highest SAT ranges for admitted students of any school in the nation.  For the class of 2015, the middle 50% range for combined math and reading SAT scores was 1420-1530.

Up until the 2007-2008 admissions cycle the school exclusively used a self-dubbed "Uncommon Application", and did not accept the more popular, nationalized Common Application, which can be sent to multiple institutions, for collegiate admissions. However, in 2009, the school adopted the Common Application and included a supplement that kept the spirit of the Uncommon Application. The cornerstone of the previously used Uncommon Application and the current supplement is a unique set of essay questions that have attracted a lot of attention for the school.  Prompts have ranged from the bizarre, "Write an essay somehow inspired by super-huge mustard," to intentionally vague prompts such as "Find X" to esoteric quotes by famous individuals such as "mind that does not stick" - Zen Master Shoitsu (in this prompt, only the quote was provided; no question was asked). In the 2011-2012 season, there was a question that referenced a game in which students use Wikipedia to draw connections between seemingly unrelated things: "What does Play-Doh have to do with Plato?"

The school's acceptance rate fell to a record low of 7.2% for the class of 2022. In comparison, the acceptance rate was 8.7% for the class of 2021. The yield also hit a record-high 72% for the class of 2021, ranking as the fourth-highest in the country, behind only Harvard, Stanford and MIT.

In June 2018, as part of its new Empower initiative, the University announced that it would become the first major American research university to adopt a test-optional policy for undergraduate applicants, along with guaranteeing free tuition to students whose families made under $125,000 per year and expanding scholarships to veterans, as well as the children of police officers and firefighters.

Academics

The college offers 52 majors (originally called 'concentrations,' but changed in 2004). A primary departmental or committee affiliation is denoted for those whose names differ from that of their field designation. A student is awarded either the A.B. or S.B. degree. The college notably does not offer majors in pre-professional areas such as engineering (with the exception of the newly introduced Molecular Engineering program) or finance; however, the school contends that students going on to graduate study in these fields often can select work in related areas such as physics or economics in order to receive adequate preparation within the liberal arts tradition. The college recently introduced minors in a select numbers of fields, and also offers several joint bachelors / masters programs to high performing students in a variety of subjects.

Core curriculum
The University of Chicago requires all undergraduates to fulfill the Common Core, which demands work across all areas of the liberal arts for both A.B. and B.S. concentrators, albeit in a form reduced from the Hutchins era. Currently, 15 courses are required in addition to tested foreign language proficiency (one year of de novo study being expected as preparation) if no Advanced Placement or International Baccalaureate examinations are used for exemption (a reduction of six credits, or two full-time quarters, may be achieved via this method). While the science curriculum has largely followed the intellectual evolution of its respective fields, the requisite humanities and social science sequences now have several variants that encompass non-Western, non-canonical, and critical theory texts. This is a departure from the school's traditional ties to texts of the European tradition such as Plato and Locke. While in totality the core curriculum's goal is to impart an education that is both timeless and a vehicle for interdisciplinary debate, the increasing number of options to students within its confines produces a wide variety of backgrounds amongst graduates.

Culture
The College often publishes literature that emphasizes the "life of the mind," drawing attention to the school's serious academic environment. Alternatively, a popular phrase with students is "where fun comes to die," describing the school's lack of a stereotypical college party culture.  Efforts in the 1990s, under President Hugo F. Sonnenschein to change some of these perceptions of the College were controversial, though ultimately successful.

Although Greek life is not predominant among the undergraduate population, there are several active fraternities and sororities that have established histories with the College, including Alpha Delta Phi, Alpha Epsilon Pi, Alpha Phi Alpha, Delta Kappa Epsilon, Delta Upsilon, Lambda Phi Epsilon, Phi Gamma Delta, Zeta Psi, Psi Upsilon, Sigma Chi, Sigma Phi Epsilon, Phi Delta Theta, and Pi Kappa Alpha fraternities, as well as alpha Kappa Delta Phi, Alpha Omicron Pi, Delta Gamma, Kappa Alpha Theta, and Pi Beta Phi sororities. The campus is also home to three coeducational professional Greek organizations, which are Alpha Phi Omega, a community service fraternity, Alpha Kappa Psi, a business fraternity, and Phi Alpha Delta, a pre-law fraternity.

Traditions

 Summer Breeze - The university's annual summer carnival and concert, held in mid-May. Past musicians who have performed at Summer Breeze include The Roots, Spoon, Wilco, Eminem, Kanye West, Run–D.M.C., Cake, Andrew Bird, They Might Be Giants, Method Man, Moby, Fuel, Nas, Jurassic 5, U2, Miles Davis, Sonic Youth, Talib Kweli, Violent Femmes, OK Go, Mos Def, George Clinton, and recently Santigold and Broken Social Scene.
 One-Dollar Shake Day - Milkshakes sell for only one dollar every Wednesday at the Reynolds Club. The Einstein Bros. Bagels franchise was allowed to open on campus only after agreeing to adhere to this tradition, though with the 2017 closing of the Einstein Bagels location, dollar shakes will be moving to Hutchinson commons.
 Midnight Breakfast - A midnight breakfast is held during every "finals week" of the academic year, attracting students and faculty members alike.
Track Team Streak - Before "finals week" of the winter quarter, the University of Chicago track and cross country team streaks through the Regenstein Library.
 O-Week - Every year since 1934, the University of Chicago has set time aside before classes begin to provide an introduction to the University for all new students.
 Lascivious Costume Ball - This event took place during the 1970–1984 period, and was a student-organized replacement of the Washington Promenade, a formal dance held in the winter since 1903, which annually crowned a Miss University of Chicago. Students would pay no fee if they came and uncloaked in the nude, a half-fee for wearing an appropriately lascivious (in the eyes of the students running the ball) costume, and full fee for remaining in "street clothes". The event was held in Ida Noyes Hall. It was formerly called the Sex Anarchy Party. This event was reinstated in November 2008, instituted by the HYPE student organization, though exposed genitalia were no longer (officially) allowed.
 Sleepout - Prior to 1993, undergraduate students would "sleep out" for classes with limited enrollment. The order of registration for classes was on a lottery basis, but in order for a student to keep his or her lottery number and avoid being reassigned to the end of the list, the student was required to physically remain on the campus quadrangle and present himself or herself at roll calls which were randomly and abruptly announced over the next few days. As a result, students would bring sleeping bags and tents and camp out on the quadrangle. Fraternities, sororities and other student groups would provide music and food, creating a festival atmosphere. The event terminated in 1993 when registration procedures changed.
 Kuviasungnerk/Kangeiko - A week-long festival celebrating Chicago in the winter. Often referred to as Kuvia, it entails a variety of events, including ice sculpting, hot chocolate get-togethers, musical performances, faculty fireside discussions, and a rigorous program of early morning exercise (kangeiko, a Japanese tradition of winter training) that culminates in a yoga-influenced "salute to the sun", performed outdoors in freezing temperatures just before the sun rises. Kuviasungnerk/Kangeiko culminates in the Polar Bear Run on the Friday of the week, in which participants run, preferably naked or semi-naked, from one end of the main quad (Harper building) to the gates across from the Regenstein Library.
 The Great Latke-Hamantash Debate - Since 1946, an annual debate has been held, mainly between faculty members - most (but not all) of whom are Jewish - about the relative merits of latkes and hamantashn. These two Jewish delicacies are associated with the holidays of Hanukkah and Purim, respectively. The lectures provide an opportunity for ordinarily serious scholars to crack jokes in a mock-serious tone. The best were collected in a book edited by Ruth Fredman Cernea. The event is currently sponsored by University of Chicago Hillel chapter and Alpha Epsilon Pi, the Jewish fraternity.
 Virginio Ferrari's Dialogo and May Day. On May Day, students and residents of Hyde Park assemble near Pick Hall to watch the shadow cast by Virginio Ferrari's sculpture. Student legend holds that the sculpture casts a shadow that resembles a hammer and sickle on the sidewalk at noon on this day. In fact, the shadow produces an accurate sickle and an object in the position of the hammer, but the shape is not an exact copy of the symbol. Ferrari was first commissioned to build the sculpture to beautify what is now the new Economics building. Hydepark.org
 Campus folklore - According to a common superstition among university students, stepping on University Seal (located in the main lobby of the Reynolds Club) as an undergraduate will prevent the student from graduating in four years. Another common superstition about the university is that nearly 50% of its students marry each other; a commonly stated, but unverified fact is that if two students date each other for more than three months, there is an 80% chance that they will marry.  Finally, if two students kiss on the bridge over the pond inside the main gates of the campus, it is said they will be destined to wed each other.

Scavenger Hunt

The annual University of Chicago Scavenger Hunt is a multi-day event in which large teams compete to obtain all of the notoriously esoteric items on a list. Held every May since 1987, it is considered  to be the largest scavenger hunt in the world. Established by student Chris Straus, "Scav" (as it is known among University students) has become one of the university's most popular traditions and has typically pushed the boundaries of absurdity. Each year, the list includes roughly 300 items, each with an assigned point value; the items vary widely, and often include performances, large-scale construction, technological construction, competition, and travel, as well as the traditional "find this item" listings. Most teams fall well short of completing half of the list and instead compete for total points amassed. The more difficult and time-consuming items earn more points, and teams typically devote more resources into these items.

Student organizations

Notable extracurricular groups include the University of Chicago College Bowl Team, which has won 118 tournaments and 15 national championships, leading both categories internationally. The Chicago Debate Society has had a top four team at the American Parliamentary Debate Association's National Championship tournament four out of the past five years. The University's competitive Model United Nations team was the top ranked team in North America in 2013-14, 2014-15, and Fall 2015. The Model UN community also hosts two major conferences per year: MUNUC (Model United Nations at the University of Chicago), held in February for high school students, and ChoMUN (Chicago Model United Nations), held in April for college students. Another notable organization is the Chicago Society, established in 2001. Chicago Society invites world-renowned speakers on a variety of issues and topics to campus. Recent invitees have included Former Secretary of State Madeleine Albright, Steven Levitt, U.S. Senator Dick Durbin, and Anwar Ibrahim. Their events have appeared in newspapers around the world.

The university's independent student newspaper is the Chicago Maroon. Founded in 1892, the same year as the university, the newspaper is published every Tuesday and Friday. South Side Weekly is a student-run alternative weekly covering issues and arts on the South Side of Chicago.

Undergraduates publish a number of periodicals as well, including Sliced Bread, an annual arts and literature publication and the University's largest magazine, the Chicago Shady Dealer, a humor magazine, and Euphony, a literary journal.

The University of Chicago's University Theater is one of the oldest student-run theatre organizations in the country, involving as many as 500 members of the university community, producing 30 to 35 shows a year, and selling on the order of 10,000 tickets. It also operates Off-Off Campus, one of the University's two improv comedy troupes, started in 1986 by Bernard Sahlins, one of the founders of The Second City.

WHPK, a student-run and University-owned radio station, broadcasts out of the Reynolds Club on the university campus. DJ "JP Chill" has had a rap and hip hop show on WHPK since 1986. It was one of the earliest rap shows in the country and the first in Chicago.

The administration has controversially worked to combat the university's reputation as a place "where fun comes to die", which some claim have discouraged top students from taking the university into serious consideration when researching colleges.

The university also hosts Doc Films, the country's oldest student-run film society.

Athletics

The school's NCAA Division III
teams, most of which are members of the University Athletic Association, are not a major focus on campus today, appearing almost "minimal" in their role on campus to "non-existent" according to students. However, in the first half of the twentieth century, the school was a powerhouse in Big Ten Conference play, notably in football where the school won numerous national championships, and produced the very first Heisman Trophy winner, Jay Berwanger. President Robert Maynard Hutchins suspended sports for several years though during his tenure fearing their digressive nature from academic endeavors, ending the prominence of most athletic programs. Today the many programs aim to cultivate the "student-athlete," the emphasis being on balance between the two. Varsity sports offered are baseball, football and wrestling for men, softball and volleyball for women, and basketball, cross country, soccer, swimming, tennis and track and field for both men and women.

House system

The college employs a house system whereby undergraduates living in dormitories are assigned to a block of students of usually no more than 70 which serves as a focal point for university events. All campus dormitories contain multiple houses. Each building is overseen by a resident dean, and for each house within, a resident head. One or two upper division undergraduates are then selected to serve in addition as resident assistants for each house. All first and second years are required to live in housing, however, the availability of affordable, off campus apartments makes them a popular option with a sizable segment of the student body. Moreover, students are free to bid or request switches amid houses both between academic years and during them. The current buildings and attendant houses of the college are:
Burton-Judson Courts (Chamberlin, Coulter, Dodd-Mead, Linn-Mathews, Salisbury, Vincent)
Campus North Residential Commons (Behar, Boyer, Dougan-Niklason, Rogers, Strongin, Thangaraj, Trott, Yuen)
International House (Booth, Breckinridge, Phoenix, Shorey, Thompson) 
Max Palevsky Residential Commons (Alper, Flint, Graham, Hoover, May, Rickert, Wallace, Woodward) 
Snell-Hitchcock Hall (Snell, Hitchcock)
Granville-Grossman Residential Commons (formerly South Campus) (Cathey, Crown, DelGiorno, Halperin, Jannotta, Keller, Kenwood, Wendt)
Woodlawn Residential Commons (Baker, Casner, Fama, Gallo, Rustandy, Yovovich, Chenn, Eka, Han, Liew, Markovitz)

References

Schools of the University of Chicago
Chicago, University of
Educational institutions established in 1892
1892 establishments in Illinois